Nacimiento Dam is a dam on the Nacimiento River about  northwest of Paso Robles, California in the United States. The primary purpose of the dam is to provide groundwater recharge for agriculture in Monterey County and northern San Luis Obispo County supported by the Salinas Valley aquifer, as well as flood control, domestic water supply, and hydropower. It forms Lake Nacimiento, popular for boating, fishing and camping, and known locally as the "Dragon Lake" due to its shape.

Although located in San Luis Obispo County, the Nacimiento Dam and nearby San Antonio Dam, which forms Lake San Antonio, are both owned and operated by the Monterey County Water Resources Agency. It was completed in 1957.

History
Prior to the construction of Nacimiento Dam, the lower Nacimiento River (and the Salinas River) only flowed during the wet season between December and May. Without enough time to be absorbed into the Salinas Valley aquifer, much of the stormwater flowed directly into the Pacific Ocean. As the Salinas Valley developed as a major agricultural region dependent on groundwater, the Monterey County Flood Control and Water Conservation District (now Monterey County Water Resources Agency, MCWRA) proposed a reservoir on the Nacimiento River to capture winter floods, and release it at a low enough rate throughout the year to maximize groundwater recharge. Because the Nacimiento River is the biggest tributary of the Salinas River, the dam would capture up to half the annual peak flows in the entire Salinas River Basin.

Under the county plan, water would only be stored when the flow rate at the confluence of the Nacimiento and Salinas Rivers exceeded , which was estimated as the highest volume the riverbed can naturally absorb. When natural runoff exceeded this amount, no water would be released. The California Department of Fish and Game (DFG) opposed the project due to the detrimental impacts this would have on winter run steelhead trout. Ultimately, the county won and was granted the water rights for the reservoir in 1955 without any provisions for fishery flows.

Construction of Nacimiento Dam began in 1955 and was completed in 1957. The reservoir filled to capacity for the first time in 1958.

Monterey County is entitled to most of the water supply from Lake Nacimiento. Although proposed since the 1950s, the Nacimiento Water Project was not completed until 2011.

Specifications
Altogether, the dam contains  of material. The concrete spillway is located on the north side of the dam and is controlled by an inflatable Obermeyer gate. There is also a small hydroelectric plant at the dam with a capacity of 4,000 kilowatts.

Due to the flooding tendency of the Nacimiento River, which has been called "the most active watershed in the state", the reservoir can fill quickly to capacity during wet winters. The spillway gates are left open between November 1 and May 1 in order to prevent the lake from overfilling. In contrast, it is often at low levels for multiple consecutive years during droughts. The lake spilled in 1958, 1969, 1983, 2011, 2017 and 2023.

See also
List of dams and reservoirs in California

References

External links
Daily reservoir levels (Monterey County Water Resources Agency)

Dams in California
United States local public utility dams
Dams completed in 1957
Earth-filled dams
1957 establishments in California